North Korea-United Kingdom Relations are the bilateral relations between North Korea and the United Kingdom.

North Korea has an embassy in London and the United Kingdom has an embassy in Pyongyang which opened in 2003 and 2001 respectively after diplomatic relations were established between the two countries in 2000.

History
During the Korean War the two countries were on opposing sides with the UK overseeing the British Commonwealth Forces Korea serving the United Nations (UN). Later during the Cold War the United Kingdom was a strong ally of the United States while North Korea was an ally of the Soviet Union.

In 1966 the North Korea national football team played in the 1966 World Cup in England. North Korea's team became the adopted team of Middlesbrough which was where they played their group games during the competition. North Korea's team had a remarkable victory by beating Italy 1–0 at Ayresome Park, Middlesbrough and finished above them, thus earning qualification to the next round. Middlesbrough fans went on to support North Korea's team in the next round of the tournament, with many travelling to Liverpool to watch the team play against Portugal. In 2002, members of North Korea team returned to Middlesbrough for an official visit, after the release of a film The Game of Their Lives about the team's visit in 1966.

Following initial progress in North Korea–South Korea relations, North Korea and the United Kingdom established diplomatic relations on 12 December 2000, opening resident embassies in London and Pyongyang. The United Kingdom provides English language and human rights training to DPRK officials, urging the North Korean government to allow a visit by the UN Special Rapporteur for Human Rights, and it oversees bilateral humanitarian projects in North Korea.

An edited version of the British Film, Bend It Like Beckham was broadcast on North Korean state television on 26 December 2010, Boxing Day. The British Ambassador to South Korea, Martin Uden, said it was the "first ever Western made film to air on television" in North Korea.

The United Kingdom has been critical of the nuclear program of North Korea.

On 5 April 2013, the North Korean government advised the British Embassy, and all other missions, that the safety of their missions could not be assured past 10 April 2013. This was part of the North Korean government's response to UN Resolution 2094 and deterioration of North Korean relations with South Korea and the United States.

In August 2016, the Deputy Ambassador of North Korea to the United Kingdom, Thae Yong-ho, defected to South Korea with the assistance of British SIS officials.

References

Further reading

 
Korea, North
United Kingdom